This is a complete list of compositions by Sergei Rachmaninoff (1873–1943).

Rachmaninoff's compositions cover a variety of musical forms and genres. Born in Novgorod, Russia in 1873, he studied at the Moscow Conservatory with Nikolai Zverev, Alexander Siloti, Sergei Taneyev and Anton Arensky, and while there, composed some of his most famous works, including the first piano concerto (Op. 1) and the Prelude in C minor (Op. 3, No. 2). Although spread over three different opuses, he did go on to complete an important set of 24 preludes in all the major and minor keys.  His Symphony No. 1 (Op. 13) was one of his first compositions as a "Free Artist" after graduation, and subsequently his first critical failure. The derision he received sent him into depression. After undergoing autosuggestive therapy, he regained his confidence and composed his second piano concerto (Op. 18), which is widely considered as one of the best piano concertos. In 1909, he made his first concert tour of the United States, and composed his Piano Concerto No. 3 (Op. 30), notable for its structural ingenuity and technical difficulty. After this, due to emigration from Russia in 1917 and his busy concert career, his output as a composer greatly decreased, and during this period, he completed only six compositions. His last major work, Symphonic Dances (Op. 45), was completed in the USA in 1940.

Works by musical form

Chronological sequence

Sources

Notes

References

External links 
 List of Compositions by Rachmaninoff on imslp.org
  Senar.ru - Streaming files of Rachmaninoff playing his compositions
  Senar.ru - Rachmaninoff sheet music download
  Chubrik.ru - Rachmaninoff audio download
 Lyrics for Songs

 
Rachmaninoff